De Palma or DePalma or De Palmas may refer to:

Film and television
Louie De Palma, a fictional character on the TV series Taxi. Role of the despotic dispatcher was played by Danny DeVito from 1978 to 1983
De Palma (film), a documentary about film director Brian De Palma

Music
De Palmas, 2013 album by French singer Gérald de Palmas

Persons

DePalma
 Anthony DePalma (1904–2005), American surgeon, humanitarian and teacher
 Dan DePalma (born 1989), American football player
 Gary DePalma (born 1976), American soccer player
 Gregory DePalma (1932–2009), American convicted criminal
 John DePalma (1885–1951), Italian-born American racing driver
 Larry DePalma (born 1965), American ice hockey player
 Ralph DePalma (1882–1956), Italian-American race driver

De Palma
 Brian De Palma (born 1940), American film director and writer
 Esteban de Palma (born 1967), Argentinian volleyball player
 Joseph-François Charpentier de Cossigny de Palma (1736–1809), French engineer and explorer
 Jula de Palma (born 1932), Italian singer
 Michele De Palma (born 1973), Italian cancer researcher
 Piero de Palma (born 1916), Italian singer
 Rossy de Palma (born 1964), Spanish actress and model
 Samuel De Palma (1918–2002), American diplomat
Fred De Palma (born 1989), Italian rapper

De Palmas
Gérald de Palmas (born 1967) as Gérald Gardrinier, French singer
Laurent de Palmas (born 1977), French football (soccer) player